Kavanak (also Romanized as Kavānak) is a village in Sarab-e Olya Rural District of Babaheydar District, Farsan County, Chaharmahal and Bakhtiari province, Iran. At the 2006 census, its population was 339 in 63 households, when it was in the Central District. The following census in 2011 counted 276 people in 61 households, by which time it was in the newly formed Babaheydar District. The latest census in 2016 showed a population of 257 people in 64 households; it was the largest village in its rural district. The village is populated by Lurs.

References 

Farsan County

Populated places in Chaharmahal and Bakhtiari Province

Populated places in Farsan County

Luri settlements in Chaharmahal and Bakhtiari Province